Stephen D. Gedney is an American electrical engineer, currently the chair and Professor of Electrical Engineering at the University of Colorado Denver's College of Engineering, Design and Computing. Gedney is a pioneer in computational electromagnetic techniques.  He is most widely known for his development of the Uniaxial Perfectly Matched Layer media method, the complex-frequency shifted convolutional PML, along with J. Alan Roden, and his contributions to the Locally Corrected Nystrom method.   Gedney's papers and textbook on the finite difference time domain technique in particular are widely cited.  Gedney is an IEEE Fellow.

References

University of Colorado faculty
American electrical engineers
American science writers
Year of birth missing (living people)
Living people
Microwave engineers
Fellow Members of the IEEE
Electrical engineering academics